James McGuinness may refer to:

 James Kevin McGuinness (1893–1950), American screenwriter and film produce
 James McGuinness (bishop) (1925–2007), Roman Catholic bishop of the Diocese of Nottingham
 Martin McGuinness (James Martin Pacelli McGuinness, 1950–2017), Irish Sinn Féin politician and deputy First Minister of Northern Ireland

See also
 Jim McGuinness (born 1972), Gaelic footballer
 Jay McGuiness (born 1990), English singer and member of The Wanted